La Concepción is a town and a municipality in the Masaya department of Nicaragua.

References 

Populated places in Nicaragua
Municipalities of the Masaya Department